Raymond Edward Epps Jr. (born August 20, 1956) is an American former professional basketball player. 

A  forward born in Amelia, Virginia, and from Norfolk State University, Epps was selected by the Golden State Warriors in the fifth round of the 1977 NBA Draft. He left college early to play for the Warriors as a "hardship case". In the 1977–78 NBA season, Epps did not play due to his injury. In the 1978–79 NBA season, he played 13 games for the Warriors and scored 26 points. In December 1978, Epps left early and was subbed with Raymond Townsend.

Afterwards, Epps played for the Montana Sky of the Western Basketball Association in the league's first and only season. His tenure began in January 1979. Less than a month later, Epps was suspended indefinitely after shoving Rex Hughes, the team's coach.

References

1956 births
Living people
African-American basketball players
American men's basketball players
Basketball players from Virginia
Golden State Warriors draft picks
Golden State Warriors players
Norfolk State Spartans men's basketball players
Western Basketball Association players
People from Amelia, Virginia
Small forwards
20th-century African-American sportspeople
21st-century African-American people